Old St. Patrick's Church, also known as The Stone St. Patrick's Church, is a historic Roman Catholic church located near Gravois Mills, Morgan County, Missouri. It was built between 1868 and 1870, and is a one-story, rectangular masonry structure with a one-story, "L"-shaped stone addition.  The church measures 24 feet, 3 inches, wide and 44 feet long.

It was listed on the National Register of Historic Places in 1979.

References

Churches in the Roman Catholic Diocese of Jefferson City
Former Roman Catholic church buildings in Missouri
Churches on the National Register of Historic Places in Missouri
Roman Catholic churches completed in 1870
Buildings and structures in Morgan County, Missouri
National Register of Historic Places in Morgan County, Missouri
19th-century Roman Catholic church buildings in the United States